Ajebo Hustlers are a Nigerian Afrobeat and Highlife duo from Port Harcourt, Nigeria, composed of Isaiah Precious a.k.a "Piego" a singer and George Dandeson a.k.a "Knowledge" a rapper. They met in 2010/2011 in a catering company where they both worked as waiters. Ajebo Hustlers were nominated at the 2022 Headies Awards for songwriter of The Year and won the Best Duo at the Soundcity MVP Awards of 2023.

Biography 
The Ajebo Hustlers grew up in the capital of Rivers State, Old GRA, Port Harcourt, they met in a restaurant where they both worked as waiters. The group became official in 2015 following the release of their single "Bole and Fish remix".

In 2020, "Barawo" Remix, produced by 1da Banton featuring BET Award-winning singer and songwriter Davido was their claim to fame, which enjoyed airplay and led charts in Nigeria and across the country. According to The Punch, the song addresses jungle justice, extrajudicial killings and police brutality. And their 2021 single "Pronto" feauring Omah Lay, which debuted on the TurnTable Top 50 charts.

In August 2021, Apple Music announced Ajebo Hustlers as the first artistes and musical duo to be featured in Nigeria's local ‘Up Next’ programme. Their debut studio album Kpos Lifestyle, Vol. 1 released the same year, established them as an important figure in the Afrobeat scene.

References

External links 

 Ajebo Hustlers at AllMusic

Nigerian highlife musicians
Living people
Nigerian musical duos
Musicians from Port Harcourt
Year of birth missing (living people)